Communist partisans were active before, during and after the Korean War in the South Korean peninsula.

They are considered the remnants of the Korean People's Army of the DPRK, some local civilians who are in favor of DPRK, some voluntary participants out of curiosity or in the reason of vengeance, and some local civilians in the region of the partisan occupying areas. They could be considered as belligerent forces behind the 38th parallel before the Korean War, behind the front lines during the Korean War, and behind the demilitarized zone after the Korean War.

Terminology
They are usually called by the name of:
 ppalchisan(빨치산; a transliteration of partisan),
 nambugun(남부군),
 kongsan bijok(공산비적) like Viet Cong, 공산주의 or 공산 means communism.
 kongbi(공비)(abbreviation of 공산비적),
 communist guerrillas(공산 게릴라).

The KongBi has now become a general term for any armed North Korean infiltrators.

Background

 1894 First Sino-Japanese War (1894–96), Qing Dynasty is defeated, its influence over Korea was ended, and the Empire of Japan occupied the Korean.
 1905 Russo-Japanese War (1904–05), Japan made Korea its protectorate with the Eulsa Treaty in 1905.

Japanese rule (1910–1945) 

 1910 Japan–Korea Annexation Treaty, Japan annexed Korean.
 1931 Japanese Machurian Incident.
 1937 Second Sino-Japanese War.
 1941 Japanese Attack on Pearl Harbor.
 1943 November Cairo Conference (November 1943), Nationalist China, the United Kingdom, and the United States decided "in due course Korea shall become free and independent".
 1945 February Yalta Conference (February 1945) gave the Soviet Union post-war pre-eminence in China and Manchuria, in return for joining the Allied Pacific War effort against Japan.

Korea divided (1945–1949) 

 1945 July Potsdam Conference (July–August 1945), the Allies unilaterally decided to divide Korea—without consulting the Koreans
 1945 August Japanese Surrender
 1945 Soviet invasion of Manchuria
 1945 Chinese Civil War (1945–1949)
 1945, 10 August 1945, the Soviet forces occupied the northern part of the Korean peninsula.
 1945, 26 August 1945, the Soviet forces halted at the 38th parallel for 3 weeks to await the arrival of US forces in the south
 1945, 8 September 1945, an army of the United States arrived in Incheon to accept the Japanese surrender south of the 38th parallel, and the United States Army Military Government in Korea(미군정;USMGIK) began.
 1945 December, Moscow Conference (1945) decided that a four-power trusteeship of up to five years would be needed before Korea attained independence

Against this decision, turmoil in the south begins, and USMGIK tried to calm down civil violence in the south by banning strikes on December 8 and outlawing the revolutionary government and the people's committees on December 12, 1945.

 1946 March, Kim Il-sung initiated a sweeping land reform program in the north.
 1946, August 28, Workers' Party of North Korea(북조선노동당) was established in the north.
 1946, September 23, A massive strike on by 8,000 railway workers in Busan which quickly spread to other cities in the South.
 1946, October 1, The Autumn Uprising of 1946 (Korean: 대구 10·1 사건). USMGIK declared martial law, and drowned in blood the uprising
 1946, November 23, Workers Party of South Korea(남로당, 남조선노동당), a communist party in the south was established, however, was outlawed by the U.S. occupation authorities, the USMGIK.

References 
The information in this article is based on that in its Korean equivalent.

Military units and formations of the Korean War
Communist guerrilla organizations
Guerrilla organizations